AD 97 (XCVII) was a common year starting on Sunday (link will display the full calendar) of the Julian calendar. At the time, it was known as the Year of the Consulship of Augustus and Rufus (or, less frequently, year 850 Ab urbe condita). The denomination AD 97 for this year has been used since the early medieval period, when the Anno Domini calendar era became the prevalent method in Europe for naming years.

Events

By place

Roman Empire 
 October 28 – Emperor Nerva recalls his general Marcus Ulpius Trajanus, age 44, from the German frontier and is forced by the Praetorian Guard to adopt him as his successor.
 Tacitus advances to consulship.
 The Roman colony of Cuicul is started in Numidia. 
 Gloucester, England is founded as Colonia Glevum Nervensis by the Romans.
 Nerva recognizes the Sanhedrin of Jamnia as an official governmental body of the Jews, and the patriarch or nasi is designated as the representative of the Jewish people in Rome.
 Sextus Julius Frontinus is appointed superintendent of the aqueducts (curator aquarum) in Rome. The public baths use half the supply.

Asia 
 Chinese general Ban Chao orders his lieutenant, Gan Ying, to establish regular relations with the Parthians.

By topic

Religion 
 Evaristus succeeds Pope Clement I as the fifth pope (according to Catholic tradition; none of the popes until the mid second century is certain).

Deaths 
 Lucius Verginius Rufus, Roman politician and general (b. AD 15)
 Timothy, Christian evangelist and saint (b. AD 17)
 Titus Petronius Secundus, Roman prefect (b. AD 40)
 Zhangde, Chinese empress of the Han Dynasty

References 

0097